Michael Edward Green (born June 23, 1985) is an American professional basketball player for who last played for Igokea of the ABA League. He played college basketball for Towson and Butler.

High school career
Green played high school basketball at Franklin Learning Center, in Philadelphia, Pennsylvania.

College career
Green played college basketball for Butler University from 2006 to 2008. He was the Horizon League men's basketball player of the year in 2007–2008 after leading Butler in points, rebounds and assists as a senior.

Professional career
He went undrafted in the 2008 NBA draft. He played for the Philadelphia 76ers in the Orlando Pro Summer League in 2010, and later with the Portland Trail Blazers in the NBA Summer League.

He played with Antalya Büyükşehir Belediyesi of the Turkish Basketball League, Liege in Belgium and Cantù in Italy.

On July 31, 2011, he signed with Sigma Barcellona of the Italian Second Division for the 2011–12 season. In July 2012, he signed with Cimberio Varese.

In July 2013, Green signed a two-year deal with the Russian team BC Khimki. In June 2014, he parted ways with Khimki.

In July 2014, he signed with Paris-Levallois.

On June 29, 2015, he signed with Reyer Venezia Mestre of the Italian Lega Basket Serie A for the 2015–16 season.

On July 28, 2016, Green signed with Turkish club Best Balıkesir. On December 14, 2016, he left Balıkesir and signed with Pınar Karşıyaka. Green played in the Basketball Champions League with Karşıyaka, and was named the Round of 16 MVP.

On August 2, 2017, he signed with AEK Athens of the Greek League for the 2017–18 season. With AEK, he won the Greek Cup title, in 2018. On May 6, 2018, Green won the FIBA Champions League title with AEK. He was named the Final Four MVP after the final, after scoring 19 points in the final game.

Career statistics

Domestic Leagues

Regular season

|-
| 2017–18
| style="text-align:left;"| A.E.K.
| align=center | GBL
| 26 || 26.6 || .391 || .358 || .856 || 2.9 || 4.5 || 0.9 || 0.1 || 10.4
|}

FIBA Champions League

|-
| style="text-align:left;background:#AFE6BA;" | 2017–18†
| style="text-align:left;" | A.E.K.
| 20 || 27.3 || .404 || .364 || .778 || 2.8 || 5.0 || .8 || .1 || 11.5
|}

References

External links
Eurocupbasketball.com profile
Legabasket.it profile

1985 births
Living people
AEK B.C. players
African-American basketball players
American expatriate basketball people in Belgium
American expatriate basketball people in Bosnia and Herzegovina
American expatriate basketball people in France
American expatriate basketball people in Greece
American expatriate basketball people in Italy
American expatriate basketball people in Russia
American expatriate basketball people in Turkey
American men's basketball players
Antalya Büyükşehir Belediyesi players
Basketball players from Philadelphia
BC Khimki players
Best Balıkesir B.K. players
Butler Bulldogs men's basketball players
Darüşşafaka Basketbol players
Karşıyaka basketball players
Lega Basket Serie A players
Liège Basket players
KK Igokea players
Metropolitans 92 players
Pallacanestro Cantù players
Pallacanestro Varese players
Point guards
Reyer Venezia players
Shooting guards
SIG Basket players
Towson Tigers men's basketball players
21st-century African-American sportspeople
20th-century African-American people